The film appearances of movie actor Errol Flynn (1909–1959) are listed here, including his short films and one unfinished feature.

Films

Television

Short films

Unmade films
The following projects were announced for Errol Flynn but were not made:
Danton (1936) based on Danton's Death and to be produced by Max Reinhardt and directed by William Diertele
The White Rajah (late 1930s) – based on the life of Sir James Brooke based on Flynn's own story
The Romantic Adventure (1938) – a romantic comedy with Joan Blondell based on an original story by Jerry Wald and Maurice Leo
The Outpost (1939) based on Caesar's Wife by Somerset Maugham starring Flynn and Geraldine Fitzgerald directed by Michael Curtiz
Shanghai (1940) from a story by Somerset Maugham
Jupiter Laughs (1940) from the play by A. J. Cronin
The Life of Simón Bolívar (1939–40) – possibly with Bette Davis
The Sea Devil (1942) – a remake of The Sea Beast which was adaptation of Moby Dick
Ghosts Don't Leave Footprints (1941) – sequel to Footsteps in the Dark
To the Last Man (early 1940s) – comedy with Alexis Smith
The Devil, George and Rosie (1943) – from a story by John Collier to star Flynn, Ann Sheridan and Humphrey Bogart
The Frontiersman (circa 1945) – an original western by Alan Le May about the beginning of a riverboat operation in the Mississippi to be produced by Flynn and Mark Hellinger with Raoul Walsh directing
Stallion Road (1945), based on a novel, with Ida Lupino
Target Japan (1945) with producer Jerry Wald and director Raoul Walsh about a B-29 bombing crew
The Man Without Friends (1945) based on story by Margaret Eckhard about a man accused of the murder of his wife to be produced by Henry Blanke and adapted by Catherine Turney
untitled adventure film "in the Frank Buck tradition" shot off the coast of Mexico produced by Flynn
Thunder Valley (1946) – a Western written by James Webb and produced by Owen Crump
General Crack (circa 1947) – remake of General Crack (1929) originally filmed starring John Barrymore
Half Way House (circa 1947) – an "alpine thriller" by Frances Potter and Spencer Rice
The Turquoise (circa 1948) with Claude Rains and Dorothy Malone based on the adventure novel by Anya Seton – set in the American southwest in the 1890s, written by Edmund North produced by William Jacobs
The Candy Kid (1948) with producer Bill Jacobs – story of a gambler in the days of Diamond Jim Brady from a script by Borden Chase based on a magazine story by Michael MacDougall
The Last of the Buccaneers (circa 1949) – a pirate movie based on a script by Flynn himself to be produced by Flynn, shot in technicolor with the star as a Robin Hood type pirate (not to be confused with the 1951 Paul Henreid film) – another source said this was to be about Bully Hayes and called The Last Buccaneer
story of the female pirate Mary Burns with Greer Garson (circa 1949) (he and Garson also discussed doing a Broadway play together)
The Man Who Cried (1950) – production with William Marshall described as a psychological thriller about the perfect crime which took place over four hours
The Man from Sparta (1951) – movie to be shot in Italy about Spartacus
The Bengal Tiger (1952)
Fire Over Africa (1952)
The Green Moss (1952) from a magazine serial by John Molloy to co-star Gordon Macrae directed by Roy del Ruth
The Talisman from the novel by Sir Walter Scott (1953)
Abdulla the King (1953) in the title role with Dawn Addams directed by Gregory Ratoff
Dragonfly (1953) – proposed adventure film from producer John Champion set in the Far East with Flynn as an air force officer whose command is threatened with desertion.
The White Witch of Rose Hall (1954) – to be made with Herbert Wilcox based on a Jamaican legend about a female plantation owner who was a witch and killed her husbands – to be produced by Barry Mahon – Flynn was still working on it in 1957 saying he wanted Bob Evans to star and Charles Marquis Warren to direct
Lord Vanity (late 1950s) – with Robert Wagner
Ten Days to Talara (1956) with the same director of The Big Boodle about an adventurer whose son is kidnapped
untitled Debbie Reynolds project as her teetotal father (circa 1958)

Films made with other actors
Flynn was announced for the following movies which were made with other actors:
Sylvia Scarlett (1935) – the part played by Brian Aherne
Four Daughters (1937) – part played by Jeffrey Lynn
The Adventures of Marco Polo (1938) – Flynn was wanted by original director William Wyler
Captain Horatio Hornblower (announced in 1940) – eventually made in 1951 with Gregory Peck
The Constant Nymph (1943) with Olivia de Havilland – part played by Charles Boyer
Affectionately Yours (1941)
In This Our Life (1942) – part played by George Brent
Reap the Wild Wind (1942) – part played by John Wayne
Mr. Skeffington (1944)
Saratoga Trunk (1945) – part played by Gary Cooper
One Last Fling (1946) – part played by Zachary Scott
The Hucksters (1947) – part played by Clark Gable
The Heiress (1948) – William Wyler reportedly wanted Flynn for the part played by Montgomery Clift
Mr. Imperium (1951) with Greer Garson
Carson City (1952) – announced for Flynn and John Wayne
Dallas (1950)
King Solomon's Mines (1950) – Stewart Granger replaced him
Ivanhoe (1952)

Box office rankings
At the height of his career, exhibitors voted Flynn among the leading stars in Britain, the US and Australia in various polls:
1937 – 11th (Australia)
1938 – 21st (US), 14th (Australia)
1939 – 8th (US), 7th (Britain)
1940 – 14th (US), 7th (Britain), 4th (territories outside Canada and US)
1941 – 14th (US)
1942 – 17th (US), 15th (internationally)
1943 – 17th (US)
1946 – 25th (US), 10th biggest Western star (Britain)

References

Male actor filmographies
American filmographies
Australian filmographies